This is a list of things named after John von Neumann. John von Neumann (1903–1957), a mathematician, is the eponym of all of the things (and topics) listed below.

Birkhoff–von Neumann algorithm
Birkhoff–von Neumann theorem
Birkhoff–von Neumann decomposition
Dirac–von Neumann axioms
Koopman–von Neumann classical mechanics
Schatten–von Neumann norm
Stone–von Neumann theorem
Taylor–von Neumann–Sedov blast wave
von Neumann algebra
Abelian von Neumann algebra
Enveloping von Neumann algebra
Finite-dimensional von Neumann algebra
von Neumann architecture
von Neumann bicommutant theorem
von Neumann bounded set
Von Neumann bottleneck
von Neumann cardinal assignment
von Neumann cellular automaton
von Neumann conjecture
von Neumann constant
Murray–von Neumann coupling constant
Jordan–von Neumann constant
von Neumann's elephant
von Neumann entropy
von Neumann entanglement entropy
von Neumann equation
von Neumann ergodic theorem
von Neumann extractor
von Neumann-Wigner interpretation
von Neumann–Wigner theorem
von Neumann measurement scheme
von Neumann mutual information
von Neumann machines
Von Neumann's mean ergodic theorem
von Neumann neighborhood
von Neumann ordinal
von Neumann paradox
von Neumann probe
von Neumann programming languages
von Neumann regular ring
 von Neumann spectral theorem
von Neumann stability analysis
von Neumann universal constructor
von Neumann universe
von Neumann–Bernays–Gödel set theory
von Neumann–Morgenstern utility theorem
von Neumann's inequality
von Neumann's theorem
von Neumann's trace inequality
Weyl–von Neumann theorem
Wigner-Von Neumann bound state in the continuum
Wold–von Neumann decomposition
Zel'dovich–von Neumann–Döring detonation model
von Neumann spike

Other
22824 von Neumann
IEEE John von Neumann Medal
John von Neumann Award
John von Neumann Center (JVNC) at Princeton University (1985-1990), part of the Consortium for Scientific Computing
John von Neumann Computer Society
John von Neumann Environmental Research Institute of the Pacific
John von Neumann Lecture
von Neumann (crater)
John von Neumann (sculpture)
John von Neumann Theory Prize
John von Neumann University

References

Neumann, John von
Neumann, John von
John von Neumann